Transit is a 2012 American action thriller film directed by Antonio Negret. It was first released on DVD in France on January 3, 2012.

Plot

An armored truck comes across a car accident in the middle of a road. The driver finds this suspicious and prepares to drive off, but the truck is suddenly attacked by masked robbers. The driver tries to make a break for it, but his partner is revealed to be in on the heist. They execute the driver when an alarm in the truck goes off, and then his partner when he questions the lead robber's motives.

After the heist, local law enforcement have created road blocks in search of the robbers. The four robbers, Marek, his girlfriend Arielle, Losada, and getaway driver Evers know that they fit the profile of the robbers and so, to prevent themselves from being caught, hide the $4 million in a tent bag belonging to a family of four who are on a camping trip. They manage to hide the bag full of money in the family's camping gear on top of their Land Rover while the family uses restrooms at a small gas station.

Both the robbers and the family drive off and arrive at the road blockade. The robbers are immediately pulled over by the police and their vehicle is searched. As it is, the family passes through the blockade with no trouble. Aside from a police scanner belonging to Marek, the police are unable to find any incriminating evidence against them and let them go. The robbers catch up to the family in their black Chevelle. The father, Nate notices the Chevelle coming up behind him very fast. He tries to outrun the vehicle, but a police car detects his speed and pulls him over. The robbers manage to get away because Arielle detected the cruiser with the scanner. Nate tries to tell the officer the Chevelle was chasing him, but the patrolman insists because they were following him at great speed, it allowed them to get away with it.

Because of Louisiana state law, Nate is given a misdemeanor for reckless driving. Nate pleads with the officer not to give him the ticket because it will violate his parole, having spent the last 18 months in jail because of real estate fraud he committed. When he innocently begs the patrolman further, he is arrested and taken to the police station. Meanwhile, his wife Robyn and his two sons Shane and Kenny drive to a motel to spend the night while await Nate's release. Nate is put in a cell block for the night. Back at the motel, the robbers invade Robyn's motel room and attack her. She locks herself in the bathroom door, then escapes through the bathroom window. The robbers are forced to leave when they learn the police are on their way. Marek is frustrated they didn't find the money in Robyn's room and gets angered further when Evers revealed the family had two motel rooms, insisting the bag must have been in the other room.

The police arrive on scene, and bring Nate along once learning of the attack on his family. They decide to reduce the charges against Nate and give the family an escort out of town. Robyn and Shane demand to return home, but along with Kenny, Nate insists they need the trip in order to repair their relationship as a family and have family memories. The next morning, they leave the motel for the campgrounds. A police cruiser escorts them a few miles down the road before turning back and racing to another emergency. Meanwhile, the robbers spot the family Land Rover and head on after it. As they keep driving, one of the straps holding the camping gear comes loose and so the family pulls over to fix it. As Nate and Robyn unload the camping gear, he hands her the sleeping bag full of money. When she opens it, her face turns white. She tells the boys to get back into the car before lashing out at Nate. Robyn believes Nate actually stole the money from members of a laundering scheme that exposed his real-estate fraud and threw him in jail, and that they were the ones who attacked her at the motel, and insists the camping trip was nothing but a ruse for them to "start over". Nate is confused by her allegations and pleads with her he didn't do anything wrong. She throws the bag at Nate and drives off with the two boys, leaving him stranded. When he looks into the bag, he realizes that the money belongs to the robbers.

Shane and Kenny plead their mother to turn the car around to get Nate, but they are attacked by the robbers in their Chevelle. They drive them off the road and cause them to crash into a log. Marek demands to know where the money is, and Robyn tells him her husband has it. Marek and Arielle drive off with the family while Losada and Evers remain in the Chevelle in-tow. Meanwhile, Nate walks on-foot, first down the road and then through the swamp adjacent to it. He hears a motorboat pass by and shouts for help. The driver of the boat spots Nate for a split second, but continues on and doesn't stop. Nate hides the money in a tree trunk and returns to the road. As soon as he does, the Land Rover speeds pass him. He chases after it, but is too late to stop it. Suddenly, the Chevelle appears and Losada and Evers apprehend him. They take him captive and drive off after the others. Losada informs Marek they have Nate and the two cars intersect. Marek demands Nate to hand over the money, but Nate says he'll get it once his family is let go. Marek refuses to negotiate and holds Nate at gun point to show him where the money is hidden. They return to the spot with the tree trunk, where to his horror, Nate discovers the money is missing. He doesn't tell the robbers this and returns, stating once his family is set free he'll give them the money (he keeps eye contact with Losada while saying this). This angers Marek again, who says he's in charge and makes the rules, however this angers Losada who claims he should be in charge instead.

Nate manipulates the two into a brawl, which allows him to run off. Arielle sees this and tells him not to do anything stupid, unknowingly allowing Robyn and the boys to escape. She drives off, but Arielle clings onto the back of the Land Rover but the boys manage to knock her out. Nate runs up to the road and Robyn slows down the car to let him get in. They speed off, but turn around after Nate tells them the next town is 40 miles away and so they're better off returning to the town with the motel. The family manages to flag down the same patrolman that arrested Nate. Suddenly, he's hit by the robbers and the family flees again. Marek steals the cop car and tries to gun them down. As the Chevelle and cruiser try to box the Land Rover, Nate notices gas leaking from the tank of the cruiser. Nate swerves the Land Rover into the cruiser, which ignites the fuel, causing the cruiser to spin out of control and crash into a ditch. Evers and Losada retrieve Marek and several weapons from the cruiser. Marek tells a wounded Arielle "he won't lose to this man." Fed up with Arielle slowing them down, Losada and Evers turn on him who insist on killing her. Marek turns the tables and holds them at gunpoint, but surprises them when he shoots Arielle in the back of the head.

Meanwhile, the family tries to escape by boat but Nate uses it to distract the robbers' attention so that they can escape. Unfortunately, this backfires as the robbers take the boat to track the family down. Robyn, Kenny and Shane come across the small headquarters of Gator Trax, the owner of the boat, located in a  cabin in the swamps. They find the bag of money locked inside, and a cb radio  and manage to contact someone for help, who says the police will be there in 30 minutes. Shane says that's not enough time. Nate hides in the bushes as Marek searches for the family. A snake however causes Nate to be spotted and forces him to run, however Marek shoots him down, demanding him to reveal the location of the money, and then his family. Meanwhile, Robyn, Shane and Kenny find the money and several loaded guns inside a locked up closet in the cabin, finally proving their father's innocence. Suddenly, they spot Evers and Losada outside. Robyn hides the kids in the closet and shoots Losada just as he breaks down the door. Evers retrieves him and a gunfight breaks out. When the firing stops, Shane sets fire to several portions of the money and throws them out the window, threatening to burn all of it if they don't let them go. Marek and Nate arrive. Marek threatens to execute Nate if they don't bring out the money. When Shane brings it out, Losada refuses to give him back his dad and is about to shoot him, however he is shot again and killed by Robyn. Shane flees back into the house with the money. Marek and Evers try to level the cabin by firing bullets at it. This allows Nate to grab Losada's gun and shoot Marek in the shoulder. He quickly grabs his machine gun and fires at Evers, whose last words to Nate are "watch your back". Nate turns around and sees Marek swing a machete at him, wounding his chest. Nate seemingly falls into the swamp as Marek takes several swings at him. Marek then enters the cabin and attacks Shane, but Robyn threatens to burn the money. Marek says she has nowhere to run, but she burns the money anyway. Marek knocks her out cold.

Nate appears and tackles Marek, and the two engage in a brutal fight. The two of them try to choke each other, however Nate slams Marek's head into a nail on a wooden deck outside the cabin, finally killing him. Robyn, Shane and Kenny mend to him, and the four of them reconcile. In the last scene, a revving car engine is heard as well as the application of brakes. A shot of Nate's wedding ring lies covered in blood on the road (Losada chopped Nate's ring finger when he found him on the side of the road) and a hand, presumably Nate's, picks it up before the screen goes black.

Cast
 Jim Caviezel – Nate Sidwell
 James Frain – Marek
 Elisabeth Röhm – Robyn Sidwell
 Sterling Knight – Shane Sidwell
 Jake Cherry - Kenny Sidwell
 Diora Baird - Arielle
 Harold Perrineau – Losada
 Ryan Donowho – Evers

Reception
Dennis Harvey of Variety wrote, "“Transit” seldom pauses long enough to let the lapses in story logic show. It’s no “Cape Fear,” but it gets the job done with a certain bloody efficiency." On review aggregator Rotten Tomatoes, the film has a score of 50% based on 8 reviews.

References

External links 
 
 

2012 films
2012 action thriller films
2010s chase films
2012 crime thriller films
2010s road movies
American action thriller films
American crime thriller films
American chase films
American road movies
Films about automobiles
Films about families
2010s English-language films
Films directed by Antonio Negret
2010s American films